The Published Reporter is an online news and opinion website created on January 1, 2019  and based in West Palm Beach, Florida. The publication focuses on news and current issues related to the United States with a local focus on South Florida, incorporating Palm Beach, Broward, and Miami Dade counties, the region where its headquarters are based. The Published Reporter'''s editor-in-chief and publisher is John Colascione who has been involved with Long Island based publications.   Colascione stated in an interview with Richard Lau of Logo.com that the news business is something he is ‘deeply passionate about’, while feeling it is not very profitable.The Published Reporter was cited twice internationally based on an interview with a WWII veteran, Philip Kahn, just before his 100th birthday, who shortly after the interview, died from the coronavirus  Kahn was interviewed in his daughter’s western Long Island home by Robert Golomb, one of the newspapers writers. On June 4, 2020, The Wall Street Journal ran an investigative story on the 2020 presidential race and political advertising regarding an inside look at how big-tech companies control advertising on their platforms. In that two-authored investigative story, reporters Patience Haggin and Emily Glazer pointed to The Published Reporter'' as being one of four media groups which they had discovered had been running advertising on Facebook which had been removed by content moderators for its controversial nature. 

In May of 2019, the Published Reporter interviewed Chinese human rights activists Doctor Yang Jianli on his experience with the Chinese Communist Government.

See also 
 Online Newspapers
 Digital journalism
 Digital media

References

Internet properties established in 2019
Publications established in 2019